Brandon Manning (born June 4, 1990) is a Canadian professional ice hockey defenceman for the Straubing Tigers of the Deutsche Eishockey Liga (DEL). Manning previously played in the National Hockey League (NHL) for the Philadelphia Flyers, Chicago Blackhawks, and the Edmonton Oilers.

Playing career
Prior to turning professional, Manning played major junior hockey in the Western Hockey League with the Chilliwack Bruins.

On November 23, 2010, during the 2010–11 season with Chilliwack, the Philadelphia Flyers signed Manning as an undrafted free agent.

On March 8, 2012, after playing 32 games (9 points) for Adirondack Phantoms in 2011–12 AHL season, he was called up to the Flyers main roster to replace injured Pavel Kubina. He made his NHL debut the same day in a home game against Florida Panthers. On August 27, 2014, Manning signed a one-year contract to stay with the Flyers.

On November 3, 2015, During a game against the Edmonton Oilers, Manning injured Oilers rookie Connor McDavid, A year later McDavid said that he admitted intent to hurt McDavid.https://www.nhl.com/news/connor-mcdavid-says-brandon-manning-intended-to-trip-him/c-284531398

On March 21, 2016, Manning scored his first career NHL goal against Thomas Greiss of the New York Islanders. 

On December 8, 2016, during a game against the Edmonton Oilers, Oilers star Connor McDavid claimed Manning boasted on-ice that he intentionally broke McDavid's collarbone the year before which had sidelined McDavid for 37 games, which he labelled as "classless" in a post game interview. Manning denied the claim. On February 27, 2017, Manning was suspended two games for interference against Jake Guentzel. Manning concluded the 2016–17 season with 12 points in 65 games.

During the 2017–18 season, Manning recorded a career-high 7 goals and 19 points in 65 games to help the Flyers qualify for the 2018 Stanley Cup playoffs. The Flyers ended up losing in 6 games to the Pittsburgh Penguins.

On July 1, 2018, Manning left the Flyers as a free agent and agreed to a two-year contract with the Chicago Blackhawks. He began the 2018–19 season on the Blackhawks third defensive pairing, adding 1 goal and 2 assists in 27 games before he was traded by Chicago, along with Robin Norell, to the Edmonton Oilers in exchange for Drake Caggiula and Jason Garrison on December 30, 2018. Manning scored 1 goal in 12 games with the Oilers, before on February 18, 2019, he was placed on waivers by the Oilers and later reassigned to AHL affiliate the Bakersfield Condors. While with the Condors, Manning was suspended for five games for using a racial slur against Boko Imama of the Ontario Reign. During his second game after the suspension, Manning was involved in a fight with Imama.

For the 2020–2021 season, Manning chose to take a break from professional hockey to focus on family.

On July 31, 2021, Manning returned to the professional ranks, having signed a one-year contract with European club, the Straubing Tigers of the Deutsche Eishockey Liga. In the 2021–22 season, his first season abroad, Manning contributed with 21 assists through 38 regular season games for the Tigers. He made 4 post-season appearances in a 3-1 quarterfinal series defeat to Adler Mannheim.

Career statistics

References

External links

 

1990 births
Adirondack Phantoms players
Bakersfield Condors players
Canadian expatriate ice hockey players in the United States
Canadian ice hockey defencemen
Chicago Blackhawks players
Chilliwack Bruins players
Edmonton Oilers players
Ice hockey people from British Columbia
Lehigh Valley Phantoms players
Living people
Philadelphia Flyers players
Prince George Spruce Kings players
Sportspeople from Prince George, British Columbia
Straubing Tigers players
Undrafted National Hockey League players